Michael Moise DeMark (born May 20, 1983) is an American professional baseball pitcher who is currently a free agent. A graduate of Penn-Trafford High School, he played college baseball at Marietta College. He played for three Major League organizations the San Diego Padres, Arizona Diamondbacks and Oakland Athletics. He was selected to play in the Arizona Fall League, a league established to showcase future Major League Stars.  He was a mid-season Texas League all-star in 2009 while playing for the San Antonio Missions. He has also played Independent Baseball in the Atlantic League of Professional Baseball for the Somerset Patriots and the York Revolution. Holds individual records for the York Revolution for most Saves in a single season as well as lowest ERA recorded in a single season while serving as the teams closer in 2016.  After that season he signed with the Uni-President 7-Eleven Lions for the 2017 season.

DeMark was selected as a member of the Italy national baseball team at the 2017 World Baseball Classic.

Currently in 2018, DeMark was selected to enter the Marietta College Hall of Fame.

References

External links
, or CPBL

1983 births
Living people
American expatriate baseball players in Mexico
American expatriate baseball players in Taiwan
American people of Italian descent
Baseball players from Pennsylvania
Cardenales de Lara players
American expatriate baseball players in Venezuela
Florence Freedom players
Lake Elsinore Storm players
Marietta Pioneers baseball players
Mexican League baseball pitchers
Midland RockHounds players
Mobile BayBears players
Naranjeros de Hermosillo players
People from Greensburg, Pennsylvania
Peoria Saguaros players
Portland Beavers players
Reno Aces players
San Antonio Missions players
Somerset Patriots players
Tigres de Quintana Roo players
Uni-President Lions players
York Revolution players
2017 World Baseball Classic players